Capela is a  municipality located in the Brazilian state of Alagoas. Its population is 16,979 (2020) and its area is 205 km².

References

Municipalities in Alagoas